Defending champions Shingo Kunieda and Gordon Reid defeated Michaël Jeremiasz and Stefan Olsson in the final, 6–3, 6–2 to win the men's doubles wheelchair tennis title at the 2016 French Open.

Seeds

Draw

Finals

References
 Draw

Wheelchair Men's Doubles
French Open, 2016 Men's Doubles